Staffan Hellstrand, Mats Eric Staffan Hellstrand, born 13 May 1956 in Stockholm, Sweden is a Swedish singer, rock musician (guitar, harmonica, keyboard), songwriter and record producer. He has scored record successes at the Swedish charts during the 1990s.

Discography

Studio albums
Hemlös (1989)
Den stora blå vägen (1991)
Eld (1992)
Regn (1993)
Sot (1994)
Pascha Jims dagbok (1996)
Underland (1998)
Underbarn (1999)
Starsång (2001)
Socker & synder (2002)
Elektriska gatan (2004)
Motljus (2006)
Spökskepp (2007)
Staffan Hellstrand (2012)
Blod & tårar (2015)

Compilation albums
Staffan Hellstrand & SH! samling 85–92 (1993)
Staffan Hellstrands bästa (2000)
Diamanter (2004)
Lilla fågel blå (2009)

References

External links

1956 births
Living people
Singers from Stockholm
Swedish guitarists
Male guitarists
Swedish pop singers
Swedish rock singers
Swedish male musicians